Van der Vinne is a Dutch surname. Notable people with the surname include:

Ferry van der Vinne (1886–1947), Dutch footballer
Jan Vincentsz van der Vinne (1663–1721), Dutch painter
Laurens van der Vinne (1658–1729), Dutch painter
Vincent Jansz van der Vinne (1736–1811), Dutch painter
Vincent Laurensz van der Vinne II (1686–1742), Dutch painter
Vincent van der Vinne (1628–1702), Dutch painter

Dutch-language surnames